Felix şi Otilia (Felix and Otilia) is a 1972 Romanian drama film based on the George Călinescu's 1938 novel Enigma Otiliei. The film was directed by Iulian Mihu and scripted by Ioan Grigorescu. The titular roles are played by Radu Boruzescu and Julieta Szönyi.

Production 
Screenwriter Ioan Grigorescu and director Iulian Mihu held "long and resultful discussions" with George Călinescu about an adaptation of the novel Enigma Otiliei. The writer said that he wanted the film to be made in the style of The Umbrellas of Cherbourg, a musical film. He allegedly hummed a song that the screenwriter allegedly reproduced to composer Anatol Vieru. But in fact, what Vieru uses in this song is a mode he has widely used in his earlier works from the sixties (Cello concerto n°1, Chamber Symphony, The Struggle against Inertia).The song was played by Aurelian Andreescu and was used before the credit titles in the beginning of the film.

References 

Romanian drama films
1972 films
1970s Romanian-language films